Louise Hedwig Anna Wilhelmine Piëch (née Porsche; 29 August 1904, in Wiener Neustadt – 10 February 1999, in Zell am See) was the daughter of automotive pioneer Ferdinand Porsche. In 1928, she married Anton Piëch, a lawyer from Vienna who from 1941 to 1945 led the KdF-Wagen (Volkswagen) factory in KdF-Stadt (present day Wolfsburg).

The couple had four children: Ernst, Louise, Ferdinand and Hans-Michel.

When her husband died in 1952, the Austrian businesswoman imported Porsche and Volkswagen cars to Austria.

When her son Ferdinand was in charge of Porsche's sports car racing program in the late 1960s, a second works team was set up, called Porsche Salzburg. One of their cars scored the marque's first overall win at Le Mans in 1970.

References

External links 
 Porsche-Holding Österreich
 Die großen Österreicherinnen

1904 births
1999 deaths
Porsche family
20th-century Austrian businesswomen
20th-century Austrian businesspeople
Businesspeople from Vienna
Commanders Crosses of the Order of Merit of the Federal Republic of Germany